9902 Kirkpatrick, provisional designation , is a Florian asteroid from the inner regions of the asteroid belt, approximately 4 kilometers in diameter. The asteroid was discovered on 3 July 1997, by American amateur astronomer Paul Comba at Prescott Observatory in Arizona, United States, and named after American musician Ralph Kirkpatrick.

Orbit and classification 

Kirkpatrick is a member of the Flora family. It orbits the Sun in the inner main-belt at a distance of 2.0–2.4 AU once every 3 years and 3 months (1,200 days). Its orbit has an eccentricity of 0.08 and an inclination of 5° with respect to the ecliptic.

Physical characteristics

Rotation period 

As of 2017, the asteroid's rotation period and shape remain unknown.

Diameter and albedo 

According to the surveys carried out by the Infrared Astronomical Satellite IRAS and NASA's Wide-field Infrared Survey Explorer with its subsequent NEOWISE mission, Kirkpatrick measures 17.8 and 3.611 kilometers in diameter, respectively. WISE/NEOWISE also gives an albedo of 0.179 for the body's surface. It has an absolute magnitude of 14.4.

Naming 

This minor planet was named after Ralph Kirkpatrick (1911–1984), an American musician, musicologist and harpsichordist. He has written a biography of Domenico Scarlatti and published a chronological catalog of his keyboard sonatas (also see ). Kirkpatrick studied 17th and 18th century performance practices in chamber music and gave concerts playing the works by Scarlatti and Bach (also see ). The official naming citation was published by the Minor Planet Center on 2 April 1999.

References

External links 
 Asteroid Lightcurve Database (LCDB), query form (info )
 Dictionary of Minor Planet Names, Google books
 Asteroids and comets rotation curves, CdR – Observatoire de Genève, Raoul Behrend
 Discovery Circumstances: Numbered Minor Planets (5001)-(10000) – Minor Planet Center
 
 

009902
Discoveries by Paul G. Comba
Named minor planets
19970703